Mikhail Nikolaevich Ptashuk; January 28, 1943 – April 26, 2002 was a  Soviet and Belorussian film director and screenwriter.

Filmography

As director 
 About Vitya, Masha, and Marines (1973)
 Forest Swing (1975)
 Time Has Chosen Us (1976)
 I'll Take Your Pain (1980)
 Black Castle Olshansky (1984)
 Sign of Disaster (1987)
 Our Armoured Train (1989)
 Co-op Politburo, or Will Long Farewell (1992)
 Game of Imagination (1995)
 In August of 1944 (2001)
 The Song of Rose (2003)

As screenwriter 
 The Song of Rose (2003)
 Colour of Love (2005)

References

External links

Belarusian film directors
1943 births
People from Lyakhavichy
2002 deaths
Soviet film directors
Road incident deaths in Russia
Recipients of the Lenin Komsomol Prize
High Courses for Scriptwriters and Film Directors alumni
Socialist realism